Data Act may refer to:

 Data Act (European Union), 2021
Data Act (Sweden), 1973
 Digital Accountability and Transparency Act of 2014, U.S.